The Navy Expeditionary Medal is a military award of the United States Navy which was established in August 1936.

Award criteria
The General Orders of the Department of the Navy which established the medal states, "The medal will be awarded, to the officers and enlisted men of the Navy who shall have actually landed on foreign territory and engaged in operations against armed opposition, or operated under circumstances which, after full consideration, shall be deemed to merit special recognition and for which service no campaign medal has been awarded. The Navy Expeditionary Medal is retroactively authorized to February 12, 1874."

Design
The medal was designed by A. A. Weinman and features a sailor beaching a craft carrying Marines, an officer, and a US flag with the word "Expeditions" above.  On the reverse of both the Marine Corps Expeditionary Medal and Navy Expeditionary Medal, in the center of the bronze medallion an eagle is shown alight upon an anchor; the eagle is facing to the left and the flukes of the anchor are to the right. The eagle is grasping sprigs of laurel, which extend beyond the anchor in both directions. Above the eagle are the words UNITED STATES MARINE CORPS or UNITED STATES NAVY presented as an arch. Above the laurel are the words FOR SERVICE presented horizontally. The eagle is the American bald eagle and represents the United States, the anchor alludes to Marine Corps or Navy service, and the laurel is symbolic of victory and achievement.

Marine Corps eligibility
The medal is one of the few Navy awards which is not concurrently bestowed to the United States Marine Corps, as Marine Corps personnel are eligible for the Marine Corps Expeditionary Medal as an equivalent award.  In addition, since 1961, some Navy commands have permitted service members to choose between the Navy Expeditionary Medal and the Armed Forces Expeditionary Medal for participation in certain operations.  Both awards may not be bestowed simultaneously for the same action.

Additional awards
Additional awards of the Navy Expeditionary Medal are denoted by service stars.

Civilian Award
The Naval Criminal Investigative Service authorized the creation of the NCIS Expeditionary Medal (NEM) for civilian employees of the agency who deployed to Iraq, Afghanistan, and Djibouti, during the Global War on Terror (GWOT) operations during Operation Iraqi Freedom and Operation Enduring Freedom.

Wake Island Device
The Wake Island Device is authorized for those service members who were awarded the Navy Expeditionary Medal through the defense of Wake Island.  As the vast majority of the defenders of Wake Island were U.S. Marines, the Navy Expeditionary Medal with the Wake Island device is one of the rarest awards in the U.S. military history, with only 68 eligible recipients.

References

Awards and decorations of the United States Navy
Awards established in 1936